BJI may refer to, 

 Bemidji Regional Airport, a domestic airport situated at Bemidji, United States
 Bishop Jerome Institute, a premier Management & Engineering Institute situated at the city of Kollam in Kerala, India